"Leave Me Alone (Let Me Cry)" is a song released in 1958 by Dicky Doo & the Don'ts, a recording alias of Gerry Granahan. The song's melody is based on the Battle Hymn of the Republic. The song spent nine weeks on the Billboard Hot 100, reaching No. 44, while reaching No. 47 on the Cash Box Top 100, and No. 29 on Canada's CHUM Hit Parade.

Chart performance

References

1958 songs
1958 singles
Swan Records singles